Beauty Nazmun Nahar (born January 1, 1984) is a track and field sprint athlete who competes internationally for Bangladesh.

Nazmun Nahar represented Bangladesh at the 2008 Summer Olympics in Beijing. She competed at the 100 metres sprint and placed eighth in her heat without advancing to the second round. She ran the distance in a time of 12.52 seconds.

References

External links
 

1984 births
Living people
Bangladeshi female sprinters
Olympic athletes of Bangladesh
Athletes (track and field) at the 2008 Summer Olympics
Athletes (track and field) at the 2010 Asian Games
Asian Games competitors for Bangladesh
Olympic female sprinters